Marine ice sheet instability (MISI) describes the potential for ice sheets grounded below sea level to destabilize in a runaway fashion. The mechanism was first proposed in the 1970s by Johannes Weertman and was quickly identified as a means by which even gradual anthropogenic warming could lead to relatively rapid sea level rise. In Antarctica, the West Antarctic Ice Sheet, the Aurora Subglacial Basin, and the Wilkes Basin are each grounded below sea level and are inherently subject to MISI.

General
The term marine ice sheet describes an ice sheet whose base rests on ground below sea level, and marine ice sheet instability describes the inherent precarious nature of marine ice sheets due to Archimedes' principle. Because seawater is denser than ice, marine ice sheets can only remain stable where the ice is thick enough for its mass to exceed the mass of the seawater displaced by the ice. In other words, wherever ice exists below sea level, it is held in place only by the weight of overlying ice. As a marine ice sheet melts, the weight of the overlying ice decreases. If melt causes thinning beyond a critical threshold, the overlying ice may no longer be heavy enough to prevent the submarine ice below it from lifting off the ground, allowing water to penetrate underneath.

The location of the grounding line, the boundary between the ice sheet and the floating ice shelves, is unstable in this case. The amount of ice flowing over the grounding line initially matches the production of ice from snow upstream. When the grounding line is pushed backwards, due to for instance melt by warm water, the ice sheet is thicker at the new location of the grounding line and the total amount of ice flowing through may increase. (This depends on the slope of the subaerial surface.) As this causes the ice sheet to lose mass, the grounding line is pushed back even further and this self-reinforcing mechanism is the cause of the instability. Ice sheets of this type have accelerated ice sheet retreat.

Strictly speaking the MISI theory is only valid if the ice shelves are free floating and not constrained in an embayment.

The initial perturbation or push-back of the grounding line might be caused by high water temperatures at the base of ice shelves so that melt increases (basal melt). The thinned ice shelves, which earlier stabilized the ice sheet, exert less of an buttressing effect (back stress).

Marine Ice Cliff Instability 
A related process known as Marine Ice Cliff Instability (MICI) posits that due to the physical characteristics of ice, subaerial ice cliffs exceeding ~90 meters in height are likely to collapse under their own weight, and could lead to runaway ice sheet retreat in a fashion similar to MISI. For an ice sheet grounded below sea level with an inland-sloping bed, ice cliff failure removes peripheral ice, which then exposes taller, more unstable ice cliffs, further perpetuating the cycle of ice front failure and retreat. Surface melt can further enhance MICI through ponding and hydrofracture.

Ocean warming

According to a 2016 published study, cold meltwater provides cooling of the ocean's surface layer, acting like a lid, and also affecting deeper waters by increasing subsurface ocean warming and thus facilitating ice melt.

Another theory discussed in 2007 for increasing warm bottom water is that changes in air circulation patterns have led to increased upwelling of warm, deep ocean water along the coast of Antarctica and that this warm water has increased melting of floating ice shelves. An ocean model has shown how changes in winds can help channel the water along deep troughs on the sea floor, toward the ice shelves of outlet glaciers.

Observations

In West Antarctica, the Thwaites and Pine Island glaciers have been identified to be potentially prone to MISI, and both glaciers have been rapidly thinning and accelerating in recent decades. In East Antarctica, Totten Glacier is the largest glacier known to be subject to MISI  and its sea level potential is comparable to that of the entire West Antarctic Ice Sheet. Totten Glacier has been losing mass nearly monotonically in recent decades, suggesting rapid retreat is possible in the near future, although the dynamic behavior of Totten Ice Shelf is known to vary on seasonal to interannual timescales. The Wilkes Basin is the only major submarine basin in Antarctica that is not thought to be sensitive to warming.

See also
Ice sheet dynamics
Seabed gouging by ice

References

Further reading
Contribution of Antarctica to past and future sea-level rise

External links
Marine Ice Sheet Instability “For Dummies”

Ice sheets
Glaciology
Effects of climate change
Articles containing video clips